Olga Lugina and Elena Pampoulova were the defending champions but only Lugina competed that year with Nino Louarsabishvili.

Louarsabishvili and Lugina lost in the first round to Ruxandra Dragomir and Inés Gorrochategui.

Dragomir and Gorrochategui won in the final 6–4, 6–0 against Meike Babel and Catherine Barclay.

Seeds
Champion seeds are indicated in bold text while text in italics indicates the round in which those seeds were eliminated.

 Kristie Boogert /  Karina Habšudová (semifinals)
 Ruxandra Dragomir /  Inés Gorrochategui (champions)
 Eva Melicharová /  Helena Vildová (quarterfinals)
 Henrieta Nagyová /  Patty Schnyder (semifinals)

Draw

External links
 1997 Warsaw Cup by Heros Doubles Draw

Warsaw Open
1997 WTA Tour